LA-18 is a constituency of Azad Kashmir Legislative Assembly which is currently represented by the Sardar Abdul Qayyum Niazi of Pakistan Tehreek-e-Insaf. It covers the area of Hajira in Poonch District of Azad Kashmir, Pakistan.

Election 2016

elections were held in this constituency on 21 July 2016.

Poonch District, Pakistan
Azad Kashmir Legislative Assembly constituencies